Gabriella Lomm Mann also known as Gabriella Mann (born 8 November 1995) is a Swedish  fashion model, auditor  and  beauty pageant titleholder who was crowned Miss Earth Sweden 2020. In 2021, she was selected to represent  Sweden in the  Miss World 2021  pageant to be held on March 16, 2022, at the José Miguel Agrelot Coliseum in San Juan, Puerto Rico.

Background and education
She was born on 8th November 1995 in Stockholm, Sweden to Miss Agneta Mann. Gabriella studied at Adolf Fredriks Elementary School, Norral Real High School and she graduated with a Bachelor in Business Administration in Finance from Stockholm University.

Career
Gabriella started modelling in 2005.  She has taken part in different runways such as New York fashion week,  Paris Fashion Week. In 2020, Gabriella represented   Sweden at Miss Earth 2020.

Personal life
Gabriella is in relationship with Niclas Lehmann (a former hockey player).

References

External references
Gabriella Lomm Mann at Miss World 2021
Gabriella Lomm Mann isn’t here to meet your expectations.
Login • Instagram
Miss Earth 2020 to push through with virtual pageant on Nov. 29
Gabriella Lomm Mann: I have always loved to express myself both within music and modeling
Gabriella representerar Sverige i Miss World 2021
American beauty crowned Miss Earth 2020
Tân Hoa hậu Thế giới Thụy Điển 2021: Nhan sắc khác biệt và body nóng bỏng, cuốn hút

Living people
1994 births
Swedish female models
Swedish beauty pageant winners
Miss Earth 2020 contestants
Miss World 2021 delegates